The Tatra 49 is a model of vintage three-wheeled motor vehicle made by Czech manufacturer Tatra.

It was developed with an aim to offer a reliable commercial car at the lowest possible  cost. It shared some parts with the Tatra 12 and Tatra 30. However the motor tricycle wasn't a commercial success and only about 200 of them were made from 1929 to 1930. A few cars of the type also had a body shell similar to the one used by the Tatra 12.

Design

Engine
The car had Tatra 49 engine. This was a four stroke, spark ignition, air cooled, single-cylinder petrol engine based on that of the Tatra 12 (basically being a Tatra 12 engine cut in half).

Chassis
The central backbone tube chassis is supported by a stiff front axle taken from a Tatra 30, while the engine and transmission box are bolted to the rear end. The freight version uses the central chassis tube as an exhaust muffler, while the personal motor car version has an extra standard exhaust muffler. Only the rear wheel is driven. The chassis weights .

References

External links
 Tatra portal - Web site about TATRA cars and trucks - Tatra 49

Cars of the Czech Republic
49
Rear-wheel-drive vehicles
1920s cars